Datla Venkata Suryanarayana Raju, better known as D. V. S. Raju (13 December 1928 – 13 November 2010) was an Indian film producer known for his works in Telugu Cinema and Bollywood. He was instrumental in shifting the Telugu film industry from Chennai to Hyderabad. He was the recipient of the Raghupathi Venkaiah Award, the Bhishma Award and the Padma Shri for his contributions to Indian cinema.

He served as Jury Member at the 15th National Film Awards & Chairperson at 46th National Film Awards. He was the Chairman of National Film Development Corporation of India (NFDC) and President of the Film Federation of India (1979–80). As NFDC Chairman, he was instrumental in co-funding the making of Richard Attenborough's Oscar-award winning film Gandhi. He had also served as Chairman of the State Film Development Corporation. He died on 13 November 2010 (Saturday) at the age of 82 years after brief illness.

Early life and film craft
He was born on 13 December 1928 in Allavaram, East Godavari district, Andhra Pradesh in a Telugu Raju family. He went to Madras (now Chennai) in 1950 and established D. V. S. Productions banner. Before establishing DVS Productions Banner, He was a Managing Partner in National Art Theatres (NAT) along with Legendary N.T.Rama Rao and N.Trivikrama Rao. Made V.Venkatraman as Production executive in Film productions and made about 25 films including one award winning Hindi film Mujhe Insaaf Chahiye. He had produced some popular films, starring N. T. Rama Rao like Pidugu Ramudu, Chinnanaati Snehithulu etc. His few noted films are Jeevitha Nouka, Jeevana Jyoti, Chanakya Sapadham, Picchi Pullaiah. `Jeevana Jyoti' has won the Nandi award.

Filmography

Awards
 He won Filmfare Award for Best Film - Telugu - Jeevana Jyothi in (1975).
 He won Nandi Award for Best Feature Film - Gold - Jeevana Jyothi in (1975).
 Andhra Pradesh Government honored him with Raghupathi Venkaiah Award in 1988.
 He was presented by Padma Shri award in 2001 by Government of India.
 He was awarded the Bhishma Award.

See also
 Raghupathi Venkaiah Award

References

External links
 

1928 births
2010 deaths
Nandi Award winners
Filmfare Awards South winners
Recipients of the Padma Shri in arts
Telugu film producers
Tamil film producers
20th-century Indian businesspeople
People from East Godavari district
Film producers from Andhra Pradesh